Kramberger is a Slovenian surname that may refer to:

Franc Kramberger (born 1936), Slovenian Roman Catholic prelate
Ivan Kramberger (1936–1992), Slovenian inventor, writer, philanthropist and politician
Nataša Kramberger (born 1983), Slovenian writer and journalist
Taja Kramberger (born 1970), Slovenian poet, translator and essayist

Also may refer to:
Dragutin Gorjanović-Kramberger (1856–1936), Croatian geologist, paleontologist and archeologist

Slovene-language surnames